Jowshaqan or Jowsheqan or  Jushaqan or Jushqan or Jusheqan may refer to:
 Jushqan, Markazi, Iran
 Jowshaqan, Esfarayen, North Khorasan Province, Iran
 Jushqan, Jajrom, North Khorasan Province, Iran
 Jowsheqan va Kamu, Isfahan Province, Iran
 Jusheqan-e Estark, Isfahan Province, Iran